Allobates kingsburyi (common name: Kingsbury's rocket frog) is a species of frog in the family Aromobatidae. It is endemic to the Amazonian slopes of the Andes in Ecuador, near the Reventador volcano and in the Pastaza River trench. Its natural habitats are tropical premontane forest within a relatively narrow altitudinal zone,  asl. It is threatened by habitat loss.

References

kingsburyi
Amphibians of Ecuador
Endemic fauna of Ecuador
Taxonomy articles created by Polbot
Amphibians described in 1918